Music Box is a four-CD set by the Monkees. It replaced the previous Monkees box set, entitled Listen to the Band. In addition to music recorded in the 1960s, it also includes music from the Monkees reunions in 1986 and 1996, as well as previously unreleased versions.

Track listing

References

The Monkees compilation albums
2001 compilation albums
Rhino Records compilation albums